(tvk for short) is an independent television station in Japan serving Kanagawa Prefecture and parts of the Greater Tokyo Area with favorable reception. The station was founded on April 20, 1971 and began broadcasting on April 1, 1972. Its call sign is JOKM-DTV (JOKM-TV during the analog broadcasting period) and occupies the UHF channel 18 on the airwaves.

The station is a member of the Japanese Association of Independent Television Stations.

History
Although there were already five main broadcasters in the Kanto region in the late 1960s, they actually lacked information on what was happening outside the Tokyo Prefecture. Therefore, prefectures in the Kanto region became involved in opening TV stations covering solely their prefectures.In 1969, the Ministry of Posts would issue UHF TV licenses for the six Kanto prefectures. Immediately, 12 companies in Kanagawa Prefecture were interested for operating a TV station.

Programming
As an independent station, tvk's programming consists mostly of local information, alternative music (some of whose musicians continue to appear on tvk, even after mainstream success), local sports, educational programmes, and anime.
 Ito Masanori no Rock City

See also
 Japanese Association of Independent Television Stations
 UHF anime

References

External links
 Company website

Television stations in Japan
Companies based in Yokohama
Mass media in Yokohama
Independent television stations in Japan
1972 establishments in Japan
Television channels and stations established in 1972